Bheeman Raghu (born 6 October 1953) is an Indian actor, singer, dancer, former politician and police officer (retired) who appears mainly in Malayalam films and is best known for his villainous and comedy roles. In a career spanning over three decades, he has appeared in more than 400 films, and has started doing comic roles as well.

Raghu's debut movie was Bheeman (1982), from which he got his stage name. By profession, Raghu was an inspector in the Kerala Police force. He came to films as one of the experimental replacements for Jayan after his death.

Raghu contested unsuccessfully in the 2016 Kerala Legislative Assembly election as a Bharatiya Janata Party candidate from Pathanapuram constituency in Kollam, securing third place.

Early life
Bheeman Raghu was born on 6 October 1953 at Changanacherry, Kottayam district in the erstwhile State of Travancore–Cochin to K. P. Damodaran Nair, former Municipal Commissioner, and Thankamma. He studied at St. Stephen's School, Pathanapuram. He had his college studies from Sanatana Dharma College, Alappuzha and University College, Thiruvananthapuram. He obtained LLB graduation from Government Law College, Thiruvananthapuram. He was a police officer before entering the cinema field.

He ran unsuccessfully as a candidate of BJP-led National Democratic Alliance in the 2016 Kerala Legislative Assembly election from Pathanapuram constituency, which received statewide attention as there was a contest of three film stars - Sitting MLA and former Minister K. B. Ganesh Kumar (Kerala Congress (B), LDF), Jagadish (Indian National Congress, UDF) and Raghu contested.

Personal life
Bheeman Raghu married Sudha Raghu on 18 January 1978. The couple have three children.

Filmography

Film

Television

References

External links
 
 Bheeman Raghu at MSI

21st-century Indian male actors
Male actors from Kottayam
Male actors from Kerala
Living people
1953 births
Male actors in Malayalam cinema
Indian male film actors
Indian police officers
People from Changanassery
20th-century Indian male actors
Bharatiya Janata Party politicians from Kerala
Government Law College, Thiruvananthapuram alumni